Fiifi is a Ghanaian masculine name that may be given to a male child whose typical day of birth falls on Friday. "Fiifi" is typically given to male child in the Fanti tribe. Each tribe in Ghana have a way to name Friday male child. Example. "Kofi" is for the Ashanti tribe, "Azuma"  for the Frafra tribe in the Northern part of Ghana etc.
Fiifi Adinkra (born 1987), Ghanaian blogger and publicist
Fiifi Aidoo (born 1996), Ghanaian-Finnish basketball player
Fiifi Fiavi Kwetey (born 1967), Ghanaian politician